Buguruni is an administrative ward in the Ilala district of the Dar es Salaam Region of Tanzania. According to the 2002 census, the ward has a total population of 67,028.

Services

Buguruni is home to the Buguruni School for the Deaf, which in 2008 enrolled approximately 240 students with hearing impairments from throughout Tanzania. The school is owned by a Tanzanian NGO, The Tanzania Society for the Deaf, chaired by Mr Daudi Mwakawago. It is supported by a UK-registered charity, Tanzanear (UK charity number 1063647/0, and previously 'Friends of the Deaf of Tanzania'), and through their work has established support for the school from Dar es Salaam Rotary Clubs and other business people. The school is aiming to become a centre of excellence for helping deaf people in Tanzania.

The Buguruni Anglican Health Centre provides medical services for residents of Buguruni and surrounding areas.  In 2006, the Centre began an initiative to provide greater support for HIV and AIDS patients through the use of testing, counseling, and antiretroviral drugs.  Other high-priority problems targeted by the Centre include malaria and food- and water-borne diseases.

Economics
In 1985, Dar es Salaam passed a law requiring small business owners to register for one of fifty-six different types of business licences.  By 1987, however, only 325 entrepreneurs out of an estimated 30,000 had applied for these licences.  City Council members attributed this non-compliance to an overwhelming majority of small business owners providing illegal goods and services.  Self-employed individuals, on the other hand, commonly viewed the law as "unjust" on the grounds that impoverished peddlers and other "business owners" could not afford the licence on their limited and unstable incomes.

References

Ilala District
Wards of Dar es Salaam Region